Jimmy Dawn Carruth II (born November 4, 1969 in El Paso, Texas) is a retired American basketball player.

He played collegiately for Virginia Tech, and appeared 4 games for the Milwaukee Bucks of the National Basketball Association (NBA) during the 1996–97 NBA season.

External links

1969 births
Living people
Basketball players from El Paso, Texas
Centers (basketball)
Fort Wayne Fury players
Grand Rapids Mackers players
Milwaukee Bucks players
Power forwards (basketball)
Undrafted National Basketball Association players
Virginia Tech Hokies men's basketball players
American men's basketball players